La Concordia is a city in Ecuador that is the cantonal capital of La Concordia Canton, belonging to the Santo Domingo de los Tsáchilas Province. It is located north of the coastal region, in an extensive plain, at an altitude of 217 meters and with a rainy climate tropical climate of 25 ° C on average.

Climate
Though it is located on the equator, the cold Humboldt current suppresses rainfall when it reaches its northernmost extent from July to November and gives La Concordia a tropical monsoon climate (Am) instead of the usual tropical rainforest climate (Af) found at and near the equator.

References 

Populated places in Santo Domingo de los Tsáchilas Province
1955 establishments in Ecuador
Populated places established in 1955